Frimley is a suburb of Hastings City, in the Hawke's Bay Region of New Zealand's North Island.

The fertile lands were added to the Hastings city boundary in 1957 to address a shortage of land.

Demographics

Frimley had a population of 2,859 at the 2018 New Zealand census, an increase of 381 people (15.4%) since the 2013 census, and an increase of 1,146 people (66.9%) since the 2006 census. There were 987 households, comprising 1,359 males and 1,503 females, giving a sex ratio of 0.9 males per female. The median age was 42.7 years (compared with 37.4 years nationally), with 537 people (18.8%) aged under 15 years, 465 (16.3%) aged 15 to 29, 1,197 (41.9%) aged 30 to 64, and 657 (23.0%) aged 65 or older.

Ethnicities were 73.0% European/Pākehā, 13.9% Māori, 4.9% Pacific peoples, 15.6% Asian, and 1.5% other ethnicities. People may identify with more than one ethnicity.

The percentage of people born overseas was 22.0, compared with 27.1% nationally.

Although some people chose not to answer the census's question about religious affiliation, 36.2% had no religion, 48.8% were Christian, 0.8% had Māori religious beliefs, 1.5% were Hindu, 0.7% were Buddhist and 6.2% had other religions.

Of those at least 15 years old, 408 (17.6%) people had a bachelor's or higher degree, and 516 (22.2%) people had no formal qualifications. The median income was $28,600, compared with $31,800 nationally. 348 people (15.0%) earned over $70,000 compared to 17.2% nationally. The employment status of those at least 15 was that 1,158 (49.9%) people were employed full-time, 303 (13.0%) were part-time, and 39 (1.7%) were unemployed.

Education

School rolls are as of

References

Suburbs of Hastings, New Zealand